The Rochester Knighthawks were a lacrosse team based in Rochester, New York, that played in the National Lacrosse League (NLL). The 2016 season was the 22nd in franchise history.

Regular season

Final standings

Game log

Roster

Transactions

Trades

Entry Draft
The 2015 NLL Entry Draft took place on September 28, 2015. The Knighthawks made the following selections:

See also
2016 NLL season

References

Rochester Knighthawks seasons
Rochester
Rochester Knighthawks